Capelatus prykei is a species of diving beetle found on the Cape Peninsula, close to Cape Town, South Africa.

The beetle has no close relatives in Africa south of the Sahara, instead being related to beetles found in the Palaearctic and Australasia.  It has been placed in a genus of its own.

References

External links 
 Capelatus prykei gen. et sp.n. (Coleoptera: Dytiscidae: Copelatinae) – a phylogenetically isolated diving beetle from the Western Cape of South Africa Systematic Entomology Early View (Online Version of Record published before inclusion in an issue) published online: 9 APR 2015  Pdf

Beetles of Africa
Beetles described in 2015
Dytiscidae